Intelligence Protection Organization of Islamic Republic of Iran Army, acronymed SAHEFAJA, is a military intelligence agency with a mission to perform counterespionage measures inside the army in order to prevent, discover and neutralize possible subversions, sabotages and coup d'etats. It has an independent command hierarchy from the army.

See also 
 List of counterintelligence organizations
 Second Bureau of Imperial Iranian Army – the agency's predecessor
 Intelligence Protection Organization of Army of the Guardians of the Islamic Revolution – similar agency

References 

Islamic Republic of Iran Army
Iranian intelligence agencies
Iranian security organisations
Military intelligence agencies
Counterintelligence agencies